Hot Springs, California may refer to:
Hot Springs, former name of Brockway, California

See also 
  Boyes Hot Springs, California 
  Desert Hot Springs, California 
  Fetters Hot Springs-Agua Caliente, California 
  Harbin Hot Springs, California